Evaristo Felice Dall'Abaco (12 July 1675, Verona, Italy — 12 July 1742, Munich, Bavaria) was an Italian composer, violinist, and cellist.

Life 
Dall'Abaco was born in Verona to renowned guitarist Damiano dall'Abaco. He is thought to have been a pupil of Torelli's from whom he would have learned violin and cello.

He became a violinist with Tommaso Antonio Vitali in Modena, and in 1704 joined the court of Maximilian II Emanuel, Elector of Bavaria in Munich as Kammermusiker. After only a few months, he fled with the court to Brussels following Maximilian's defeat at the Battle of Blenheim. When he went into exile with the court, he spent time in France and absorbed some of the influences there. On Maximilian's restoration and return to Munich in 1715, Dall'Abaco was appointed Concert-meister. He continued to compose chamber music at the French and Dutch courts until 1740, when he retired. Dall'Abaco's music is especially indebted to Vivaldi and Corelli. Dall'Abaco passed away on his 67th birthday

While in Brussels, dall'Abaco fathered Joseph Abaco (1710–1805).

Published works 
 Opus 1: 12 Sonate da Camera, for violin and violoncello with accompaniment
 Opus 2: 12 Concerti a quattro da Chiesa
 Opus 3: 12 Sonate da Chiesa a tre
 Opus 4: 12 Sonate da Camera a violino e violoncello
 Opus 5 & 6: Concerti a piu Instrumenti

External links

References 

1675 births
1742 deaths
18th-century Italian composers
18th-century violinists
18th-century Italian male musicians
Italian Baroque composers
Italian male classical composers
Italian violinists
Italian cellists
Male violinists
Musicians from Verona